The Metz Company was a pioneer brass era automobile maker established by Charles Herman Metz in Waltham, Massachusetts, from 1909 to 1922.

History
C. H. Metz began in business in 1886 making bicycle parts, and in 1893 formed the Waltham Manufacturing Company with Herbert L. Thompson, Elmer G. Howe and Frank L. Howe. Later the firm developed designs for motorized vehicles. Metz departed his company over disagreements of company direction in 1901. He became the technical editor of the Cycle and Automobile Trade Journal.  

Waltham Manufacturing Co. was in financial difficulties and in 1908 C. H. Metz took back control. He reorganized as the Metz Company in 1909.

Kit car
Metz inherited a large stock of automobile parts for the 10-hp runabout designed by William H. Little. Although Metz was not the first to offer a kit car (Dyke and Sears predated Metz with do-it-your-self high-wheelers), Metz did offer the first known kit automobile on the installment plan, known as the Metz Plan.  The buyer would buy 14 groups or packages of parts for $27 which would be put together with the plans and tools supplied, for a total price of $378,.  A factory-assembled automobile could be bought for $475.  The plan was in effect until 1911 when it became impractical to compete with a dealer-supplied model "T" Ford. 

In 1910,  the two-cylinder 10-hp Metz was increased to 12-hp. Built on a 81-inch wheelbase, complete runabouts or special delivery body cars were produced into 1912.

Model 22

In 1913, Metz introduced the Model 22, a two-seat roadster or torpedo bodied car, with an en-bloc 22½ hp (17 kW) four-cylinder water-cooled engine.  The Metz 22 had a 90-inch wheelbase with Bosch magneto, full-elliptic springs front and rear, artillery wheels with Goodrich clincher tires, and featured a Prest-O-Lite-type acetylene generator for the headlights.  It was billed as "gearless", having a friction drive mechanism, and priced at $475, .

Advertisements claimed to be the "winner of the Glidden Tour", due to all 3 of the participating Metz cars receiving a perfect score.  In 1914 Metz had a Speedster model added at a price of $500.   In 1915, Model 22 became Model 25 with an improved 25-hp engine on a 108-inch wheelbase.

Fate
In 1917 Metz added 3 types of light trucks to their car production, but business was curtailed in 1918 due to the World War. The Factory was turned over to war work, but post-war road-blocks caused Metz to never collect $130,000 due from the government. In 1919 Metz fielded a larger car called the Metz Master 6, with a six-cylinder 45-hp engine. This 120-inch wheelbase car, with a price range from $1,895 to $2,895 for an enclosed sedan, did not sell well.

The post-war depression caused a dire financial condition and Metz was taken over by the Waltham National Bank. They reorganized the company and renamed it the Motor Manufacturers Incorporated of Waltham. The Metz Master 6 was renamed the Waltham Six, which sold for $2,450 and was produced in 1922 only.  This restructuring attempt failed, and Charles Metz filed for Bankruptcy in August 1922.

See also
Classic Speedsters Blog Charles Metz Speedster
Metz/Waltham Automobiles Blog
Metz car in the Grand Canyon

References 

Brass Era vehicles
Defunct motor vehicle manufacturers of the United States
1910s cars
Defunct companies based in Massachusetts
Companies based in Waltham, Massachusetts
Motor vehicle manufacturers based in Massachusetts
Cars introduced in 1909
Vehicle manufacturing companies established in 1909
Vehicle manufacturing companies disestablished in 1922
1920s cars
Vintage vehicles